Craig Bauer is an American Grammy Award winning mixing engineer and record producer. He has been nominated for two Album of the Year Grammy Awards for his work on Kanye West’s multiplatinum album Late Registration and double platinum follow-up album, Graduation. He won a Grammy Award in 2008 for mixing The Clark Sisters’ 2007 album, "Live: One Last Time".

In 2012, he mixed Ed Sheeran's live performances at HINGE studios as part of The Warner Sound "The Live Room" series, which has collectively garnered 95 million views on YouTube. The performances included "The A Team", "Give Me Love", "You Don't Need Me, I Don't Need You", "Lego House" and "Be My Husband" (Nina Simone cover).

Craig Bauer has worked with high-profile artists across multiple genres, including; pop, singer-songwriter, electronica, rock, country, jazz, hip-hop, gospel and R&B. His clients include: Kanye West, Lupe Fiasco, Justin Timberlake, Halo Circus, Justin Young, THE Nghbrs, Anita Wilson, Ed Sheeran, The Clark Sisters, Janet Jackson, Rihanna, Common, Jennifer Hudson, Lil’ Kim, Wu-Tang Clan, Da Brat, Brian Culbertson, Richard Marx, 98°, Yolanda Adams, Steve Cole, Dave Koz, Dennis DeYoung, Styx, Donald Lawrence, Destiny’s Child, Public Enemy, Hezekiah Walker, The Silhouet, and The Smashing Pumpkins.

He also mixed the Saturday Night Live Digital Short “Motherlover” featuring Justin Timberlake and Andy Sandburg.

Awards
Craig Bauer received a Grammy award at the 50th Annual Grammy Awards for mixing The Clark Sisters’ 2007 album, Live: One Last Time and has been recognized by NARAS and the Grammy‘s for over 30 nominations in various categories and genres. He has been nominated twice for Album of the Year.

Life and career
Craig Bauer was born and raised in Cleveland, Ohio, where he worked through the ranks of the studios there before migrating to Chicago, Illinois in the early 1990s to open his own recording studio. Beyond the technical aspects of being a mixing engineer, he is also musician. He studied Classical Piano and Music Education at Ohio State University and is also a skilled guitar player.

In 1993, he opened Hinge Studios at 320 W. Ohio Street in Chicago, Illinois. Many of his first clients were jazz artists, including, Dave Koz, Brian Culbertson, Steve Cole and Peter White.

By 1997, Craig Bauer began working with a young rap group dubbed “The Go Getters”, which included a very young Kanye West. Several of the demos that Kanye West recorded at Hinge Studios were built into tracks on the album The College Dropout. Bauer later mixed “Heard ‘Em Say”, “Roses”, “Bring Me Down”, “Addiction” 
and “Late” on Kanye West’s Late Registration Album which was nominated for the Album of the Year Grammy Award at the 48th Annual Grammy Awards. He also mixed on Kanye's follow-up album Graduation, which was nominated again for Album of the Year at the 50th Annual Grammy Awards.

Craig Bauer mixed Lupe Fiasco’s debut studio album Lupe Fiasco’s Food & Liquor in 2006, which received four Grammy Award nominations at the 49th Grammy Awards, including Grammy Award for Best Rap Album. In 2007, he mixed the majority of Fiasco’s second album, Lupe Fiasco’s The Cool, including the hit single “Superstar” which peaked at #10 on the Billboard Hot 100. The Cool was nominated for 4 awards at the 51st Grammy Awards.

In 2008, Craig Bauer won his first Grammy award for mixing The Clark Sisters album Live: One Last Time at the 50th Annual Grammy Awards. Later that year he moved Hinge Studios to 1719 S. Clinton Street in Chicago. Today, Craig Bauer and Hinge Studios is located in Los Angeles, California.

At the 2018 Winter NAMM Show, Bauer hosted an Avid Mixing Master Class with the Avid S6 & MTRX Interface, featuring his work on "Narcissist" performed by Allison Iraheta and Halo Circus. Over the summer he also hosted a Master Class for Avid in Nashville. Bauer is also a beta tester for the Avid S6 control surface and complementary software.

Craig Bauer is an artist endorser for Hear Technologies, Plugin Alliance and Brainworx. He has also developed a line of custom presets.

Hinge Studios
Opened by Craig Bauer in 1993, Hinge Studios was a premiere Midwest recording and mixing facility located in Chicago, Illinois. Hinge Studios was a pioneer in ushering in the world of digital recording with one of the country’s first Euphonix CSII digitally controlled recording consoles and the very first Otari RADAR 48 track hard disk recording system.

In 2014, Hinge Studios relocated to Los Angeles, California, where the studio was temporarily operating at the historic Devonshire Studios in North Hollywood. Hinge Studios is now permanently located in Los Angeles, California, in a highly acclaimed Northward Acoustics designed room. The studio features an Avid S6 control surface and ATC speakers.

Hinge Studios Chicago was once dubbed “Kanye West’s fortress of solitude in the late ‘90s” by MTVNews.

In 2012, Ed Sheeran performed at Hinge Studios Chicago for “The Live Room” video series powered by the Warner Music Group.

Selected Discography
 2019: J GRGRY, Open Roads — Mixing
 2019: Soleil Moon, Warrior — Mixing
 2019: Michael Thompson Band - Love & Beyond — Mixing
 2019: Donald Lawrence & The Sri-City Singers, Deliver Me- Feat. L’eandria Johnson — Mixing
 2019: Donald Lawrence & The Sri-City Singers, YHWH — Mixing
 2019: Anita Wilson, Here's To Life — Mixing
 2018: Halo Circus, Robots and Wranglers — Mixing
 2018: The Nghbrs, All or Nothing — Mixing
 2018: Low Swans, Break Up — Mixing
 2018: Anna Mae, You Might Be Better — Mixing
 2018: B. Howard, Nite and Day 3.0 — Mixing
 2018: Halo Circus, Robots and Wranglers — Mixing
 2018: Bill Champlin, Bleeding Secrets — Mixing
 2017: Ted Winn, Stand in Awe — Mixing
 2017: Anita Wilson, Sunday Song — Mixing
 2016: Hezekiah Walker, Azusa: The Next Generation 2: Better – Mixing
 2016: B. Reith, Heart on My Sleeve — Mixing
 2015: Justin Young, Burn Me Down — Mixing
 2015: Genevieve, Take Me Down — Mixing
 2015: Karen Clark Sheard, Destined to Win — Mixing
 2015: James Maslow, Lies — Mixing
 2015: B.Howard, Don't Say You Love Me — Mixing
 2014: Anita Wilson, Vintage Worship — Mixing
 2014: Common, Nobody's Smiling — Vocal Engineer
 2014: Kanisha K, Bring Me Home — Mixing
 2014: Cozi Zuehlsdorff, Originals — Mixing
 2014: Aleem, Need You Here — Production & Mixing
 2014: Cowboy Troy, King of Clubs — Mixing
 2013: Donald Lawrence, 20 Years Celebration, Vol. 1: Best for Last – Mixing
 2013: Hezekiah Walker, Azusa: The Next Generation – Mixing
 2013: Michael Thompson, Future Past – Mixing
 2012: Anita Wilson, Worship Soul — Mixing
 2012: Bishop Paul S. Morton, Sr., Best Days Yet – Mixing
 2012: Soleil Moon, On the Way to Everything – Guitar (Acoustic), Keyboards, Mixing, Producer, Programming, Tracking		
 2011: Nick Carter, I’m Taking Off – Mixing
 2011: Ashlyne Huff, Let It Out — Mixing
 2011: Steve Cole, Moonlight – Engineer, Mixing
 2011: Donald Lawrence, YRM — Mixing
 2010: Stan Walker, From the Inside Out – Mixing
 2009: Stan Walker, Introducing Stan Walker – Mixing
 2009: Sara Haze, My Personal Sky – Mixing
 2009: Vanessa Bell Armstrong, The Experience – Mixing
 2009: Donald Lawrence, The Law of Confession, Part I – Mixing
 2008: Brian Culbertson, Christmas & Hits Duos – Engineer
 2008: Donald Lawrence, Matthew 28: The Greatest Hits – Mixing
 2008: Pastor Hezekiah Walker, Souled Out – Mixing
 2008: (Various Artists), Total Club Hits – Mixing
 2007: Yung Berg, Almost Famous EP – Mixing
 2007: The Clark Sisters, Live: One Last Time – Mixing
 2007: Dave Koz, Memories of a Winter’s Night – Mixing
 2007: Kurt Elling, Nightmoves – Engineer, Mixing
 2007: Dennis DeYoung, One Hundred Years from Now – Engineer, Mixing
 2007: Yung Berg, Sexy Lady – Mixing
 2006: Rihanna, The Cool – Mixing
 2007: Lupe Fiasco, The Cool – Mixing
 2007: Tri-City Singers, The Grand Finale: Encourage Yourself – Audio Supervisor, Mixing
 2006: Brian Culbertson, A Soulful Christmas – Engineer
 2006: Shawnna Block, Music – Engineer, Mixing
 2006: Tri-City Singers Donald Lawrence, Presents: The Tri-City Singers – Finale – Audio Supervisor, Mixing
 2006: Donald Lawrence, Finalé: Act One – Mixing
 2006: Lupe Fiasco, Food & Liquor – Mixing
 2006: Dave Hollister, The Book of David, Vol 1: The Transition — Engineer
 2006: Hezekiah Walker & the Love Fellowship Crusade Choir, 20/85 the Experience – Mixing
 2005: Ludacris Presents, Disturbing tha Peace – Mixing
 2005: Kanye West, Late Registration – Mixing
 2005: Public Enemy, New Whirl Odor – Engineering
 2004: LaShell Griffen, Free – Arranger, Engineer, Guitar (Acoustic), Mixing, Organ (Hammond), Producer, Pro-Tools, Vocal Engineer, Vocal Producer.
 2004: Donald Lawrence, I Speak Life – Audio Engineer, Engineer, Mixing
 2004: The O’Jays, Imagination – Mixing
 2004: Dennis DeYoung, Music of Styx: Live with the Symphony Orchestra – Mixing
 2004: Oprah’s Popstar Challenge – Digital Editing, Engineer, Mixing, Producer
 2003: Brian Culbertson, Come on Up – Background Noise, Digital Editing, Engineer, Mixing, Performer, Pro-Tools
 2003: Donald Lawrence, The Best of Donald Lawrence & the Tri-City Singers: Restoring the Years – Engineer, Mixing
 2001: Brian Culbertson, Nice & Slow – Engineer, Mixing
 2000: Richard Marx, Days in Avalon [Signal 21] – Mixing
 2000: Da Brat, Unrestricted – Engineer
 1999: Styx, Brave New World – Engineer, Mixing
 1998: Yolanda Adams, Songs from the Heart – Engineer
 1997: 98°, 98° – Engineer
 1997: Richard Marx, Flesh & Bone – Engineer
 1996: CeCe Peniston – I'm Movin' On'' – Mixing

References

External links
Craig Bauer Official Website
The Warren Sound: Ed Sheeran at The Live Room, Hinge Studios

Grammy Award winners
Living people
Year of birth missing (living people)
Businesspeople from Cleveland
Ohio State University alumni
Musicians from Chicago